Aberconwy (Welsh for mouth of the River Conwy) may refer to:

Aberconwy (UK Parliament constituency) (2010–)
Aberconwy (Senedd constituency) (2007–)
Aberconwy, an electoral ward of Conwy town
Aberconwy Abbey, a Cistercian foundation at Conwy, later transferred to Maenan near Llanrwst
District of Aberconwy, a defunct administrative division of Gwynedd
Battle of Aberconwy (1196)
Treaty of Aberconwy (1277)

See also
Aberconway (disambiguation), an Anglicised spelling